Nuculida is an order of small saltwater clams, marine bivalve mollusks. This order belongs to the subclass Protobranchia. "Nuculida" is sometimes spelled "Nuculoida".

References

 WoRMS page for this taxon

 
Bivalve orders